Harlington railway station is located in Bedfordshire. It is named after the village of Harlington, on the outskirts of which it is located, but serves a wide rural area including the larger villages of Toddington and Barton-le-Clay.

History
It was built by the Midland Railway in 1868 on its extension to St. Pancras. The original intention had been to call it "Harlington for Toddington". The station buildings still exist and were carefully restored in the early 1980s. The station is situated on the Midland Main Line and managed by Thameslink.

Stationmasters
In 1909 the station master, William Drake, was killed at the station whilst directing shunting operations at the station. A verdict of accidental death was recorded. 

T. Tomblin 1870 - 1875
Frederick Christian 1875 - 1898 (afterwards station master at Shefford)
G.G. Best 1898 - 1903
William Drake 1903 - 1909
Ernest Joseph Clulow 1909 - ca. 1911 (formerly station master at Godmanchester)
J.J. Davies ca. 1914 - 1924
Robert Arthur Gill 1924 - 1931 (formerly station master at Hemel Hempstead)
Frederick Charles Watson 1933 - 1940 (afterwards station master at Kenilworth)
A. Latimer from 1940 (formerly station master at Kimbolton, also station master at Leagrave)

Services
All services at Harlington are operated by Thameslink using  EMUs.

The typical off-peak service in trains per hour is:
 4 tph to 
 2 tph to 
 2 tph to Three Bridges via 

Facilities

Harlington station has the following facilities:
Shelters on each platform
1 telephone
1 Ticket Machine
Cycle storage for 44 bikes
Car park with 127 spaces

The station has a PlusBus scheme where train and bus tickets can be bought together for a cheaper price. It is in the same area as Flitwick station.

As well as Harlington village itself, the station also serves the villages of Barton-le-Clay, Toddington and Westoning.

Ticket Office opening hours

The ticket office is open for just over 7½ hours per day Mondays to Friday and 6 hours per day on Saturday.

In January 2009, the previous franchisee First Capital Connect proposed that the ticket office at Harlington railway station would open for just four hours per day. The proposals were for the office to open at 0645 (previously 0600) and close at 1030 (currently 1850) on weekdays. There would be no weekend opening under these proposals. The single automated ticket machine, which was stolen in summer 2008, was replaced the same week that the proposals were announced.  Subsequently, whilst a reduction in hours was agreed, although not to the degree set out in the initial proposal (see above).

References

Gallery

External links

Railway stations in Bedfordshire
DfT Category D stations
Former Midland Railway stations
Railway stations in Great Britain opened in 1868
Railway stations served by Govia Thameslink Railway